Paroricopis latefasciatus is a species of beetle in the family Cerambycidae, and the only species in the genus Paroricopis. It was described by Breuning in 1958.

References

Epicastini
Beetles described in 1958